María Fátima Blázquez Lozano (born 14 May 1975) is a road cyclist from Spain. She represented her nation at the 1996 Summer Olympics in the women's road race and at the 2000 Summer Olympics in the women's road race.

References

External links
 

Spanish female cyclists
Cyclists at the 2000 Summer Olympics
Olympic cyclists of Spain
Living people
Sportspeople from Salamanca
Cyclists at the 1996 Summer Olympics
1975 births
Cyclists from Castile and León
20th-century Spanish women